Decoder is a 1984 West German film directed by Muscha.  It is a cyberpunk and counter-cultural film roughly based on the writings of William S. Burroughs, who also acts in the film.  Bill Rice plays Jaeger ("Hunter"), an agent of the government in charge of suppressing dissidents, while FM Einheit plays a burger shop employee who discovers that by changing the background music from pleasantly calming to industrial "noise" music, he can incite riots and a revolution against the looming power of the government.

Decoder was made on a small budget, and was written by Muscha, Klaus Maeck, Volker Schäfer, and Trini Trimpop.  Nevertheless, the project was able to attract a number of notable people within the countercultural and industrial music "scenes" to perform in it.  Actors included Burroughs, Genesis P-Orridge, Christiane Felscherinow, and bands included Soft Cell, Psychic TV, Einstürzende Neubauten, and The The.

The film was considered "oddly forgotten", and for numerous years was not in wide circulation. In 2019, however, the film was re-released on Blu-ray and DVD.

Cast
F.M. Einheit as F.M.
Bill Rice as Jaeger
Christiane F. as Christiana
Berthold Bell as H-Burger trainer (as Britzhold Baron De Belle)
Matthias Fuchs as H-Burger manager
William S. Burroughs as Old Man
Genesis P-Orridge as High Priest
Ralf Richter

See also
 The Electronic Revolution, by Burroughs

References

External links
 

1984 films
West German films
1980s German-language films
Cyberpunk films
Films about conspiracy theories
German avant-garde and experimental films
Punk films
William S. Burroughs
1980s avant-garde and experimental films
1980s German films